Zalifa Bente Salim is a Malagasy politician.  A member of the National Assembly of Madagascar, she was elected from the Fanjava Velogno party; she represents the constituency of Analalava.

References
Profile on National Assembly site

Year of birth missing (living people)
Living people
Members of the National Assembly (Madagascar)
Fanjava Velogno politicians
21st-century Malagasy women politicians
21st-century Malagasy politicians
Place of birth missing (living people)